Zhou Xiaohui, known professionally as Ms Yeah, is a Chinese YouTuber and chef. In each video, a dish, usually Chinese, is prepared using tools found in a typical office workspace. Her videos are characterized by lack of narration, voiceover, or conversation, which helped to popularize the channel abroad.

According to Ms Yeah, she works at a creative company, which allowed her and her fellow coworkers to perform cooking in the office. Although the videos always have Ms Yeah as the main actor, the camera is primarily controlled by an unknown camera operator, while coworkers play bit parts.

Most of the food cooked in the videos are common Chinese dishes and not difficult to prepare per se. Ms Yeah has admitted that the final results often did not taste good, but the goal of her channel is not to teach viewers how to cook; hence there are no cooking instructions. As Ms Yeah stated herself, "I don't want to be a 'cooking teacher'. I don't want to teach you how to cook, and I don't want to teach the science of cooking. I just want to show you an attitude towards life. You can find the joy of life whenever and wherever you are."

Popularity
Some videos feature product placement; at a cost of 500,000 CNY, a product will be shown in the video. Unusually for a Chinese celebrity, the channel is more popular overseas than with domestic viewers, having 2.8 million followers on Facebook compared to 2.55 million on Weibo . Due to lack of narration, the videos have almost no language barrier. Furthermore, Ms Yeah and the production team use English on foreign social media, and in public appearances she appears to be fluent in English. This may explain the videos' popularity abroad. As of September 2019, Ms Yeah has more than 7.51 million subscribers, making her one of the most successful Chinese YouTubers ever, despite the fact that access to YouTube has been restricted in China since 2008.

Controversy
In 2019, two girls aged 12 and 14 from Shandong, were injured, one of them fatally, after allegedly attempting to copy one of Ms Yeah's videos. Ms Yeah paid a compensation for the hospital bills of the girls, but denied responsibility, as she warned users not to copy the videos, and the girl did not copy the exact method. Following the accident, she reportedly considered quitting the video series after netizens blamed her for being responsible for the girl's death, but after a one month hiatus she continued uploading. The video that was reportedly imitated has since been removed from the channel.

Personal life
Growing up, Zhou learned cooking from her father, who managed a hotel.

She holds a degree in choreography from Sichuan Normal University and a major in video directing. Her first job was an internship at Chengdu Radio & Television (成都电视台) as a video director, followed by a job as a wedding planner until working for her current employer.

On 1 November 2020, Zhou announced her marriage to her long-time boyfriend.

References

Chinese YouTubers
Mandarin-language YouTube channels
YouTube channels launched in 2017
1994 births
Living people